Eligible Bachelors is the third studio album by English band The Monochrome Set. It was released in 1982, through record label Cherry Red.

Background 

Eligible Bachelors was produced by former Steeleye Span member Tim Hart. It was The Monochrome Set's first album since the departure of original drummer John Haney.

The original LP had a faux white leather sleeve designed by Tom Hardy, better known as guitarist Lester Square. The back cover's liner notes featured raves about the band from various critics from around the world, including London, New York, San Francisco, Japan and Kansas.

Track listing

Critical reception 

AllMusic called it "one of the classic undiscovered albums of the early '80s, Eligible Bachelors is a tour de force of wit and musical imagination" and "an age-defining record". Trouser Press praised the band's "witty intelligence" and said that the album "strips the music down to essential elements".

Personnel 
The Monochrome Set
 Bid – lead vocals, guitar, sleeve design
 Lester Square – lead guitar, keyboards, vocals
 Lexington Crane – drums, vocals
 Andrew Warren – bass guitar, vocals
Technical
 Tim Hart – production
 Dave Cook – engineering

References

External links 

 

The Monochrome Set albums
1982 albums
Cherry Red Records albums